De Quervain's thyroiditis, also  known as subacute granulomatous thyroiditis or giant cell thyroiditis, is a member of the group of thyroiditis conditions known as resolving thyroiditis. People of all ages and genders may be affected.

Presentation
Patients will experience a hyperthyroid period as the cellular lining of colloid spaces fails, allowing abundant colloid into the circulation, with neck pain and fever. Patients typically then become hypothyroid as the pituitary reduces TSH production and the inappropriately released colloid is depleted before resolving to euthyroid. The symptoms are those of hyperthyroidism and hypothyroidism. In addition, patients may suffer from painful dysphagia.  There are multi-nucleated giant cells on histology. Thyroid antibodies can be present in some cases. The clinical presentation during the hyperthyroid phase can mimic those of Diffuse Toxic Goiter or Graves' disease. In such cases, a radionuclide thyroid uptake and scan can be helpful, since subacute thyroiditis will result in decreased isotope uptake, while Graves' disease will generally result in increased uptake. Distinguishing between these two types of disease is important, since Graves' disease and Diffuse Toxic Goiter can be treated with radioiodine therapy, but subacute thyroiditis is usually self-limited and is not treated with radioiodine.

Causes
Some cases may be viral in origin, perhaps preceded by an upper respiratory tract infection. Viral causes include Coxsackie virus, mumps and adenoviruses. Some cases develop postpartum.

Pathophysiology
In the initial phase of damage to the gland, preformed thyroid hormone will 'fall out' of the damaged cells. This leads to symptoms and biochemistry of an overactive thyroid (feels hot, trembly, anxious, loses weight, fast heart rate, sweaty, greasy hair), with raised free T3 and free T4, and a suppressed thyroid stimulating hormone (TSH) value. The damaged cells will no longer be able to take up iodine in order to manufacture further supplies of thyroid hormone, and thus in due course the patient comes to experience the symptoms of an underactive thyroid (feels cold, tired, depressed, gains weight, dry skin and hair) with low free T3 and free T4, and eventually increased TSH.

Diagnosis
With the standard overactive thyroid, iodine uptake into the thyroid is avid, whereas if the cells are damaged, then uptake is poor. In this way, if there is doubt about whether the patient has too much thyroid hormone because of de Quervain's thyroiditis, then measuring radio-iodine uptake or technetium uptake gives a clear cut answer as it will be higher than normal in standard thyrotoxicosis and lower than normal in de Quervain's.

Treatment
Treatment is beta blockers, aspirin, and NSAIDs (or corticosteroids if NSAIDs are ineffective).

Eponym
It is named for Fritz de Quervain. It should not be confused with De Quervain syndrome.

Terminology
It is sometimes called subacute thyroiditis, but there are other forms of subacute thyroiditis, subacute lymphocytic thyroiditis, postpartum thyroiditis, and autoimmune thyroiditis all of which, in contrast to de Quervain's, are typically painless or "silent".
It is also sometimes called "painful subacute thyroiditis". This is in contrast to subacute lymphocytic thyroiditis, which is also sometimes called "painless thyroiditis".

References

External links 

Thyroid disease